Synaphea tamminensis is a shrub endemic to Western Australia.

The shrub blooms between August and September producing yellow flowers.

It is found in small area in the Wheatbelt region of Western Australia near Tammin where it grows in sandy-loamy soils over laterite.

References

Eudicots of Western Australia
tamminensis
Endemic flora of Western Australia
Plants described in 1995